Sebastián Alquati (born 20 May 1976) is an Argentine former judoka who competed in the 1996 Summer Olympics and in the 2000 Summer Olympics.

References

1976 births
Living people
Argentine male judoka
Olympic judoka of Argentina
Judoka at the 1996 Summer Olympics
Judoka at the 2000 Summer Olympics